Castledermot is an inland town in the south-east of Ireland in County Kildare, about  from Dublin, and  from the town of Carlow. The N9 road from Dublin to Waterford previously passed through the village but upon completion of a motorway bypass in 2010, it was re-designated the R448.

History

The earliest known Irish Parliament met at Castledermot on 18 June 1264.   Also, the oldest intact window in Western Europe can be found in the town, being part of the ruins of a Franciscan Monastery. The window, although large, is only stonework. St. Laurence O'Toole, (1128 - 1180) or Lorcán Ua Tuathail, was born at Castledermot.

In July 1903 the Gordon Bennett Cup passed through Castledermot.

Public transport

Bus
The main bus route serving Castledermot is J.J. Kavanagh & Sons route 736 providing a limited number of daily services to Carlow, Waterford, Dublin and Dublin Airport. This service was reduced in 2015 which impacted local commuters and community members seeking to visit hospitals in Kildare and Dublin. Visitors who wish to visit Castledermot outside of the small number of services that pass through the town must alight at slip road off the M9 for Carlow and avail of a taxi service into Castledermot. South Kildare Community Transport operate a route from Castledermot to Athy twice a day each way Mondays to Fridays inclusive. Bus Éireann used to serve Castledermot more frequently, but the solitary Sunday evening journey was withdrawn in 2015. Castledermot is also served by bus route 880 operated by Kildare Local Link on behalf of the National Transport Authority. There are several buses each day including Sunday linking the town to Carlow and Naas as well as villages such as Moone in the area.

Rail
Carlow railway station is approximately 11 kilometres distant. Athy railway station is around 14 kilometres distant.

Demographics

The population of the town was 887 at the time of the (January 2006) census, a 22% increase over the figure recorded in 2002. As of the 2016 census, the population of the village had grown further to 1,475 people. The settlement is growing due to its proximity to Dublin.

Notable features
The River Lerr (a tributary of the larger River Barrow, the second longest river in Ireland) flows through the town.

In the town there are various remains including Castledermot Round Tower, Saint John's Tower and two well-preserved granite high crosses and the ruins of Castledermot Abbey, a Franciscan friary.  away is Kilkea Castle, once the residence of the Duke of Leinster, but now a hotel and health farm. The castle was built by the English Norman Hugh de Lacy in 1180, and later passed to the Fitzgeralds. Gerald FitzGerald, 11th Earl of Kildare, is said to have practised magic in Kilkea Castle which earned him the nickname "the Wizard Earl".

Education
There are two schools in the town. The national school, Scoil Diarmada, is on the Athy road out of Castledermot and was opened in January 2009. It has two floors, and an elevator for easier access for disabled people. The secondary school, Colaiste Lorcain, is located on the main street.

Sport
Sporting organisations in Castledermot include the local GAA team, Castledermot GAA (which has men's and women's teams), and plays Gaelic football and hurling. There are also local Gaelic handball, basketball, soccer and cricket teams.

Castle Villa, whose grounds are at Mullarney Park, are one of the most successful soccer teams in Leinster. Two of the club's most successful teams of the past were the 1979 team which won the Counties Cup and the Sheeran Cup winners of 1984. More recently, the club was crowned Lumsden League Cup Champions in 2016 and have been Kildare Senior League champions on several occasions.

See also
 List of towns and villages in Ireland
 List of abbeys and priories in Ireland (County Kildare)

References

External links

Towns and villages in County Kildare